Vöcklamarkt is a railway station in the town of Vöcklamarkt, Upper Austria, Austria. The train services are operated by ÖBB and Stern und Hafferl. The ÖBB station has two passing tracks for express and freight trains.

Train services
The station is served by the following services:

References

External links
Austrian Railway (ÖBB) website 
Panoramio photo of the station

Railway stations in Upper Austria